Of Monsters and Men is an Icelandic indie folk/rock band formed in Reykjavík in 2010. The members are lead singer and guitarist Nanna Bryndís Hilmarsdóttir, singer and guitarist Ragnar "Raggi" Þórhallsson, lead guitarist Brynjar Leifsson, drummer Arnar Rósenkranz Hilmarsson and bassist Kristján Páll Kristjánsson. The band won the Músíktilraunir in 2010, an annual battle of the bands competition in Iceland. In 2011, Of Monsters and Men released an EP titled Into the Woods. The band's 2011 debut album My Head Is an Animal, reached the No.1 position in Australia, Iceland, Ireland and the US Rock and Alternative charts, while peaking at No. 6 on the US Billboard 200 album chart, No. 3 in the UK, and Top 20 of most European charts and Canada. Its lead single "Little Talks" was an international success, reaching the Top 10 in most music charts in Europe, including No. 1 in Ireland and Iceland, and No. 1 on US Alternative Songs.

Of Monsters and Men won the 2013 European Border Breakers Awards.

History

2009–2010: Formation and early work 
The band's origins began in 2009 when Nanna Bryndís Hilmarsdóttir decided to add additional members to her previously solo project, Songbird. Of Monsters and Men entered 2010's Músíktilraunir, an annual music competition held in Iceland, as a quartet with members Nanna (lead vocals, acoustic guitar), Brynjar (electric guitar), Raggi (backing vocals, melodica, glockenspiel), and Arnar (backing vocals, melodica, glockenspiel, tambourine). Raggi came up with the band name, Of Monsters and Men, and everyone else liked it, so it stuck.

Following Músiktilraunir, the quartet added two more members, Árni (accordion/keys, backing vocals) and Kristján (bass, backing vocals), and continued to tour venues in Iceland and work on new songs. They were invited to perform at the 2010 Iceland Airwaves festival, and it is there that the Seattle-based radio station KEXP recorded the band performing "Little Talks" from a living room session.

2011–2013: My Head Is an Animal 

The band signed with Record Records in February 2011 for the release of their debut album in Iceland. In March 2011, they went to Studio Sýrland in Reykjavík to record and produce their debut album. In August 2011, Philadelphia's Radio 104.5 began playing "Little Talks" and propelled the band to nationwide popularity. Their debut album My Head Is an Animal was released in Iceland in September 2011 with both it and "Little Talks" hitting No. 1.

With success in Iceland and growing popularity in the United States, the band signed with Universal for a worldwide release of their debut album. The band released its Into the Woods EP on 20 December 2011, which features four songs from their debut album, and later released My Head Is an Animal in the United States on 3 April 2012.

The band performed at the Newport Folk Festival in Newport, Rhode Island, on 29 July 2012, Osheaga Festival in Montreal on 3 August 2012, and then at Lollapalooza in Chicago on 5 August 2012. They have toured in several European countries including Ireland, Germany, Italy, and Sweden. Of Monsters and Men also appeared 5 October 2012, on the new PBS music show Sound Tracks: Music Without Borders, performing "Mountain Sound". Later Árni Guðjónsson left the band to go back to school.

Trumpeter Ragnhildur Gunnarsdóttir joined in the 2012 tour as a session player. The band has not commented on interest to eventually bring her into the band.

The band performed "Little Talks" and "Mountain Sound" on Saturday Night Live on 4 May 2013, and performed in the 1st Annual Boston Calling Music Festival on 26 May 2013. The band also played T in the Park in July 2013, the biggest music festival in Scotland. They performed on both Lollapalooza Brazil and Chile. They also performed at Coachella, on 12 and 19 April 2013. On 26 January 2013, "Little Talks" was voted into the Triple J Hottest 100 of 2012 at number two, a prestigious musical honour in Australia. They appeared at Bonnaroo Music Festival in Manchester, Tennessee, in June 2013 and played at The Other Stage at Glastonbury Festival in that same month. On 14 July 2013, the band performed in Optimus Alive! festival, in Lisbon, Portugal, one of the most popular festivals in Europe.

Their song "Dirty Paws", from which the title of the album originated, was featured in a trailer for the 2013 film The Secret Life of Walter Mitty and the iPhone 5 introduction video released in September 2012. They contributed the track "Silhouettes" to The Hunger Games: Catching Fire soundtrack. Their song "Sinking Man" is featured on The Walking Dead: Original Soundtrack – Vol. 1.

2014–2018: Beneath the Skin 

The band began working on a new album in August 2013. In an interview published on 6 May 2014, Nanna stated that the album was forthcoming, but that the band had not decided on a release date yet. They officially began recording on 3 November 2014. At a listening session in February 2015, the band announced that their yet to be named second studio album would release later in the year. The band posted a teaser video on their site for the album's first single, "Crystals". It was released on 16 March 2015 along with the track list and other details about their upcoming album Beneath the Skin, set to be released on 8 June. The album and single artwork was created by artist Leif Podhajsky.

In May 2015, the band released dates for a tour to promote the upcoming  album. The North American leg of the tour ran from 5 August 2015 to 17 October 2015. The track "Thousand Eyes" was featured heavily in the preseason advertising for Jessica Jones. The band appeared in a cameo on the episodes "The Door" and "Blood of My Blood" of Game of Thrones as stage musicians.

The band was included on Coachella's 2016 line-up. In November 2016, their cover of "Eleanor Rigby" was the feature of episode 21b of Beat Bugs. On 21 May 2017, Of Monsters and Men posted a picture on their Instagram account with the caption "Album 3. Let's do this!!!" In October 2017, it was announced that the band had hit one billion streams on Spotify, becoming the first Icelandic band to do so.

2019–present: Fever Dream and Tíu 

On 2 May 2019, the band released "Alligator", the first single from their third album Fever Dream, released on 26 July. On 11 July 2019, the band released the track "Wild Roses". On 26 July 2019, the band released the single, "Wars", as a lyric video on their YouTube channel along with their entire album.

On 9 September 2020, the band unveiled a single titled "Visitor", along with a music video. On 8 April 2021, the band released a single titled "Destroyer".

On 9 June 2022, the band released their premiere screening of Tíu at the 2022 Tribeca Film festival as a celebration of the 10 year anniversary of the band's release of 'My Head is an Animal'.

This was followed by special live acoustic performance of their new songs Visitor, This Happiness, and Lonely Weather by the band.

Band members 

Current members
 Nanna Bryndís Hilmarsdóttir – lead vocals, guitars, piano, organ, writes (2010–present)
 Ragnar Þórhallsson – co-lead vocals, guitars, melodica, glockenspiel, writes (2010–present)
 Brynjar Leifsson – lead guitars, melodica, tambourine, backing vocals (2010–present)
 Kristján Páll Kristjánsson – bass guitars, egg shaker, backing vocals (2010–present)
 Arnar Rósenkranz Hilmarsson – drums, percussion, melodica, glockenspiel, accordion, keyboard, piano, acoustic guitar, backing vocals, writes (2010–present)

Former members
 Árni Guðjónsson – accordion, piano, organ, keyboards, backing vocals (2010–2012)

Touring members
 Ragnhildur Gunnarsdóttir – trumpet, accordion, keyboards, piano, floor tom, tambourine, backing vocals (2010–present)
 Steingrimur Karl Teague – piano, keyboards, organ, accordion, backing vocals (2012–present)
 Bjarni Þór Jensson – guitar, percussion, keyboards (2015–present)
 Sigrún Kristbjörg Jónsdóttir – trombone, percussion, accordion (2015–present)

Discography

Studio albums

Live albums

Extended plays

Singles

Other charted songs

Other appearances

Table notes

Music videos

Accolades

References

External links 
 

2010 establishments in Iceland
Chamber pop musicians
Icelandic indie pop groups
Indie folk groups
Musical groups established in 2010
Musical groups from Reykjavík
Musical quintets
Republic Records artists